The Funiculaire du Perce-Neige in Tignes, France is an underground Funicular from the neighborhood Val Claret to the summer-skiing area and the lower station of the Telepherique Grande Motte.

General information

The system opened on 15 June 1989. The name Perce-Neige is a play on words, in that perce-neige is the French word for a snowdrop but can also be interpreted more literally as the funicular that pierces through the snow.

Technical details

See also 
 List of funicular railways

References 

 
 

Perce-Neige, Funiculaire Du
Von Roll Holding people movers
1200 mm gauge railways in France
Railway lines opened in 1989
Underground funiculars